The Christina Range is a mountain range in southeastern British Columbia, Canada, located roughly north of Grand Forks, between Lower Arrow Lake and the Granby River. It has an area of 2442 km2 and is a subrange of the Monashee Mountains, which in turn form part of the Columbia Mountains.

See also
List of mountain ranges

References

Monashee Mountains
Boundary Country
Arrow Lakes